WAA may refer to:
 Wa (unit), a Thai unit length sometimes transliterated as waa
 Waa, the Crow counterpart to Bunjil in Kulin culture
 Wales Airport (Alaska), IATA code WAA
 War Assets Administration
 West African Airlines
 Western Association of Architects, a defunct professional body now merged with the American Institute of Architects, active from 1884 to 1889
 Wiltshire Air Ambulance, the emergency air ambulance serving Wiltshire, England
 Wisconsin Arborist Association
 Withdrawal of application for admission, a procedure in United States immigration law
 Women's Action Alliance, a feminist organization in the United States, founded in 1971 during the Women's Movement
 Workers Alliance of America, American political organization established in 1935
 Woolclassers' Association of Australia